Angustipes is a genus of air-breathing land slugs, terrestrial pulmonate gastropod mollusks in the family Veronicellidae, the leatherleaf slugs.

Species 
 Angustipes ameghini (Gambetta, 1923) – black-velvet leatherleaf

References

Veronicellidae